Moses Narbonne, also known as Moses of Narbonne, mestre Vidal Bellshom, maestro Vidal Blasom, and Moses Narboni, was a medieval Catalan philosopher and physician. He was born at Perpignan, in the Kingdom of Majorca, at the end of the thirteenth century and died sometime after 1362. He began studying philosophy with his father when he was thirteen and then studied with Moses and Abraham Caslari. He studied medicine and eventually became a successful physician, and was well versed in Biblical and rabbinical literature.

Eventually he traveled to the Crown of Aragon, where he is known to have lived and studied in Cervera (1348-1349), Barcelona and Valencia, and later in Toledo, Burgos and Soria (1358-1362), in the Kingdom of Castile. In 1362 he returned to Perpignan and died there. During the outbreak of the Black Death when persecution of Jews was widespread, ben Joshua was forced to flee Cervera when an angry mob attacked the Jewish community there. During his stay in Barcelona, he wrote a commentary on the medieval philosophical tale Hayy Ibn-Yaqzan, in which he called to appropriate autodidacticism as a pedagogical program.

Moses was an admirer of Averroes; he devoted a great deal of study to his works and wrote commentaries on a number of them. Perhaps Narboni's best known work is his Treatise on the Perfection of the Soul.

He believed that Judaism was a guide to the highest degree of theoretical and moral truth. In common with others of his era he believed that the Torah had both a simple, direct meaning accessible to the average reader as well as a deeper, metaphysical meaning accessible to thinkers. He rejected the belief in miracles, instead believing they could be explained, and defended man's free will by philosophical arguments.  Because of these and other beliefs, he was not accepted by many in the rabbinical Jewish community for fear of his figurative membership in the school of extreme rationalism which gave rise to questions of his legitimacy as an authority on Jewish law, custom and philosophy.

He died at an advanced age as he was returning to his native land from Soria.

Known writings
 "Perush mi-Millot ha-Higgayon," on the terminology of Maimonides' Treatise on Logic
 commentary on the "Guide for the Perplexed"
 "Ma'amar Alexander be-Sekel," supercommentary on Averroes' commentary on Alexander of Aphrodisias' work on the intellect
 a commentary on Averroes' "middle" commentary on Aristotle's "Physics"
 a commentary on Averroes' paraphrase of the "Organon"
 a commentary on the fourth part of Avicenna's "Canon"
 a commentary on al-Ghazali's "Maḳaṣid al-Falasifah"
 "Iggeret 'Al-Shi'ur Ḳomah," a mystical letter on the "Shi'ur Komah," attributed to the Tanna, Rabbi Yishmael
 a commentary on the Book of Lamentations
 a commentary on Averroes' treatise on the hylic intellect and the possibility of conjunction
 "Shelemut ha-Nefesh," a collection of Aristotle's and Averroes' writings on the soul
 a commentary on Averroes' dissertation on physics and on the treatise "De Substantia Orbis"
 "Ketab Ḥai ben Yaḳẓan," commentary on the philosophical novel of Ibn Ṭufail
 "Oraḥ Ḥayyim," a treatise on medicine
 "Ma'amar bi-Beḥirah," a treatise on free will written in refutation of Abner of Burgos
 a commentary on Averroes' commentary on the "De Cœlo et Mundo"
 a treatise on metaphysics
 "Pirḳe Mosheh," philosophical aphorisms
 "Iggeret Meyuḥedet," on Abraham ibn Ezra's commentary on Genesis 11:2

References 
3-ـ كتاب كمال النفس لــ موسى النربونى ...ترجمة ودراسة نقدية (حسام الدين العفيفى أحمد محمود سليمان)...رسالة ماجستير ــ جامعة الأزهر2007
Avner Ben-Zaken, "Climbing on the Ladder of Philosophy", in Reading Hayy Ibn-Yaqzan: A Cross-Cultural History of Autodidacticism (Johns Hopkins University Press, 2011), pp. 42–64.

ـ كتاب كمال النفس لــ موسى النربونى ...ترجمة ودراسة نقدية (حسام الدين العفيفى أحمد محمود سليمان)...رسالة ماجستر ــ جامعة الأزهر 2007م

Philosophers from Catalonia
13th-century births
14th-century deaths